Silk Museum can refer to any of the following:

Bsous Silk Museum, Lebanon
The Silk Museum, Macclesfield, in Cheshire, England
Yokohama Silk Museum
Museum of Calabrian textile, silk, costume and fashion handicrafts